Corey Spring (born May 31, 1971) is a Canadian former professional ice hockey player who played 16 games for the Tampa Bay Lightning of the National Hockey League.

Playing career

Born in Cranbrook, British Columbia, Spring began his career in the British Columbia Junior Hockey League with the Vernon Lakers before spending four years with the University of Alaska Fairbanks.  He turned pro in 1995 with the International Hockey League's Atlanta Knights.  After two high-scoring seasons in the American Hockey League with the Adirondack Red Wings, Spring made his NHL debut for the Lightning during the 1997-98 NHL season, playing eight games in all and scored one goal.  He played another eight games the next season for Tampa Bay, with one assist to his credit.  He went on to have spells in the IHL for the Cleveland Lumberjacks, Detroit Vipers and Manitoba Moose.  He moved to Europe with a brief spell in Germany's Deutsche Eishockey Liga for the Augsburger Panther before spending a season in the British Ice Hockey Superleague with the Manchester Storm.  He left the Storm mid-season to return to the United States, joining the Long Beach Ice Dogs of the West Coast Hockey League.  He returned to Europe in 2001, joining German 2nd Bundesliga side EC Bad Tölz.  He returned to the British Superleague in 2002 with the Bracknell Bees in what turned out to be the league's final year in existence.  After the Superleague folded, Spring spent one final year in Germany with Oberliga team ERC Selb before retiring in 2004.

Personal life

He is the son of Frank Spring who played in the NHL in the 1970s for the Boston Bruins, St.Louis Blues, California Golden Seals, and Cleveland Barons.

Career statistics

Regular season and playoffs

External links

1971 births
Living people
Adirondack Red Wings players
Alaska Nanooks men's ice hockey players
Atlanta Knights players
Augsburger Panther players
Bracknell Bees players
Canadian ice hockey right wingers
Cleveland Lumberjacks players
Detroit Vipers players
Ice hockey people from British Columbia
Long Beach Ice Dogs (WCHL) players
Manchester Storm (1995–2002) players
Manitoba Moose (IHL) players
Penticton Knights players
Sportspeople from Cranbrook, British Columbia
Tampa Bay Lightning players
Undrafted National Hockey League players
Vernon Lakers players
Canadian expatriate ice hockey players in England
Canadian expatriate ice hockey players in Germany